The College of Fine Arts Kerala is a fine arts college located in Trivandrum (Thiruvananthapuram).

History
The college was founded in 1881 by Moolam Thirunal Sir Rama Varma, the Maharaja for the state of Travancore. The college was first known as H. H. The Maharaja’s School of Arts, Travancore. In 1063 (1881),· Mr. K. Narayana Iyer was sent to Madras to study the working of the
School of Arts there. He returned towards the middle of the next year, and was appointed First Superintendent of the
newly-instituted School of Arts in Trivandrum. Mr. K. Narayana Iyer resided at Vazhuthacaud near Women's College. M.R.Madhavan Unnithan was heading the institution during 1920s. He was superintendent during 1920s to 1930s. After him T.S. Seshadri was designated as the superintendent and appointed by the Diwon of Travancre, Sir. C.P. Ramaswami Iyer. Seshadri was a Travancore palace artist who was very famous for oil paintings and portraits.

In the beginning the school offered courses for drawing and painting, and three subjects of handicrafts namely ivory work, pottery and smithery. There were a two years junior course and two years senior course. An entrance test was there in freehand drawing even during 1930s. The selected students were given a scholarship of Rs.5/- for the junior course and Rs.7/- for the senior course during 1930s. It was under the department of education and by 1930s, it was brought under the dept of Industries ignoring the protest from the Dept of Education. When University of Travancore came into being it was brought under the University. In 1957, after the formation of first democratically elected government in Kerala, the School of Arts was brought under the Directorate of Technical Education. In 1975, the school was upgraded as the College of Fine Arts and became affiliated with the University of Kerala. In 2001, the college celebrated its silver jubilee year with exhibitions, seminars and workshops.

Organisation
The college is under the  Directorate of Technical Education, Govt. of Kerala, and is affiliated to the University of Kerala, Thiruvananthapuram . It is a UGC recognised institution.

The college offers Post Graduate MFA courses in Painting and Sculpture. Duration of the course is four semesters. It also offers professional Bachelor of Fine Arts (BFA) courses broadly in three disciplines: Painting, Sculpture and Applied Art. Duration of the BFA course is four years. After the completion of  four years, students have to appear for the examination conducted by the University of Kerala.

The curriculum of the first year of the four-year BFA degree course is an integrated course for all students and acts as a foundation to the BFA specialisation courses. Students who pass the first year university examination are allotted one of the three specialisations according to their talent and choice.
The MFA follows semester system.

People who headed the institution
K. Narayana Aiyar  ( first Supdt, 1888). https://archive.org/details/IvoryIndia
M.R.Madhavan Unnithan ( Supdt.,School of Arts during 1920s )
T.S. Seshadri( Supdt.,School of Arts during 1940s )
C.K Ramakrishnan Nair (CK Ra) (Supdt.,School of Arts during 1960s )

List of principals after upgrading to college in 1975
C.L. Porinjukutty - 1976 to 1986
Kanayi Kunhiraman - 1987 -1987
K.V. Haridasan    - 1987 -1992
M. Sanathanan     - 1992 -1997
Kattoor Narayana Pillai-1997-2001
S.Ajayakumar      - 2001 - 2011
N. N. Rimzon        - 2011  - 2014
A.S. Sajith  - 2014 - 2017
Tensing Joseph  - 2017 - 2018
Manoj Vyloor - 2020 - 2022
Narayanankutty k - 2022 -

Current principal
Prof. Narayanankutty k

Artists
Over the years a number of distinguished artists and art educators of the country have nurtured the college:

 Krishna K. Hebbar. 
 Narayan Shridhar Bendre
 Ghulam Mohammed Sheikh
 K.G.Subramanyan
 A.Ramachandran
 R.Sivakumar
 George Martin. P.J
 Aji. V.N
 Hareendran T.K
 N. L. Balakrishnan

References

External links
- www.cfakerala.ac.in - This is the official website of College of Fine Arts Kerala, Thiruvananthapuram
- www.dtekerala.gov.in - This is the official website of Directorate of Technical Education, Govt.of Kerala
- Information and photograph from 1900s in British Library United Kingdom online gallery

Colleges in Thiruvananthapuram
Arts and Science colleges in Kerala
Art schools in India
1881 establishments in India
Schools in Kerala